The Flugmotorenwerke Ostmark (German for Aircraft Engine Factory Eastern March) was a large German aircraft engine supplier during World War II, a part of the Steyr-Daimler-Puch cartel. It specialized in engines for the majority of aeroplanes designed by the Heinkel works and had three large factories at its disposal: in Wiener Neudorf, Biedermannsdorf and Guntramsdorf. It also closely cooperated with the Steyr company, located nearby. All the factories used slave labour of the inmates of the Mauthausen-Gusen concentration camp. After the war, the company's sites were taken over by Eco Plus.

External links 
 
 

Aircraft engine manufacturers of Austria
Junkers
Mauthausen concentration camp
Mercedes-Benz Group
Companies involved in the Holocaust